Wilhelm Reich first identified the phallic narcissistic personality type, with excessively inflated self-image. The individual is elitist, a "social climber", admiration seeking, self-promoting, bragging and empowered by social success.

According to Otto Fenichel, 'Phallic characters are persons whose behavior is reckless, resolute and self-assured - traits, however, that have a reactive character: they reflect a fixation at the phallic level, with overvaluation of the penis and confusion of the penis with the whole body'. Fenichel stressed that 'an intense vanity and sensitiveness reveals that these narcissistic patients still have their narcissistic needs...for which they overcompensate'.

Others would add that 'the phallic character conceives of sexual behaviour as a display of potency, in contrast to the genital character, who conceives of it as participation in a relationship'.

References

Narcissism
Wilhelm Reich